Bonneval-sur-Arc ("Bonneval-on-Arc";  or simply Bônavâl) is an alpine commune in the Savoie department in the Auvergne-Rhône-Alpes region in Southeastern France. It is located on the Italian border, with part of its territory within Vanoise National Park. In 2019, the commune had a population of 259.

It is a member of the Les Plus Beaux Villages de France association.

Climate
Bonneval-sur-Arc features an alpine climate due to its high elevation, just under the tree line. Its climate is characterised by very cold, snowy winters and cool, stormy summers.

See also
Communes of the Savoie department

References

External links
Official site
Tourism site

Communes of Savoie
Plus Beaux Villages de France